James William Napier Robertson (born 24 March 1982) is a New Zealand writer, film director, actor and producer, who wrote and directed  2009 film I'm Not Harry Jenson, and 2014 film The Dark Horse, for which he won Best Director, Best Screenplay and Best Film at the 2014 New Zealand Film Awards, and which was declared by New Zealand critics "One of the greatest New Zealand films ever made". 

Robertson also wrote and directed two episodes of the Logie Award winning crime drama Romper Stomper, and appeared earlier in his career as an actor in Shakespearean theater and several television productions including The Tribe and Being Eve, describing how his acting work "funded his early filmmaking".

Early life
Born in Wellington, New Zealand, but moving to Auckland at a young age, Robertson grew up in Devonport and attended Takapuna Grammar School, where he first started acting in Shakespeare productions and musicals.

His uncle is actor Marshall Napier and his cousin is Marshall's daughter, actress Jessica Napier. He is also related to the author Charles Dickens.

Early career
Robertson  joined a local outdoor Shakespeare Theatre Company in his late teens, which he performed with for a number of years, often at the Pumphouse Theatre Amphitheatre. He has described this time with the company as his favorite period of acting.

After this period he was cast in a number of local and international television shows which he acted in for the next few years, both in support and lead roles.  He was first cast in Being Eve as Jared Preston, a wayward teenager at the titular Eve's school, then in Shortland Street, and Mercy Peak as Luke Bertram, an arsonist dealing with his mother's death by burning down local buildings until he is caught by the police.

In 2002 Robertson was cast for two seasons in UK show The Tribe, a post apocalyptic series about a virus that has wiped out all adults, leaving only young people to fight amongst each other.  In 2004 he was cast for one season as a lead actor on US show Power Rangers Dino Thunder, playing Conner McKnight, a soccer player and the Red Ranger. The show was filmed in New Zealand and featured an almost entirely New Zealand cast, including friend and future film producer Tom Hern.  

Throughout this period he said he was less interested in acting, instead using the money from these shows to fund the short films he was writing and directing in his early twenties and purchase film equipment.

Recent work
In his mid twenties, Robertson wrote and directed his first feature film, I'm Not Harry Jenson, with friends Tom Hern and Edward Sampson both taking roles as producers in the film. The film premiered at the 2009 New Zealand International Film Festival and was nominated for Best Picture at the 2009 AFTA Awards (New Zealand Film and TV Awards). It was picked up by Rialto Distribution for a New Zealand wide theatrical release from January to March 2010 to strong reviews, but low box office.

The Dark Horse

In 2010 Robertson started work on his second feature film, The Dark Horse, based on the life story of Genesis Potini, a Māori chess player who suffered from severe bipolar. Robertson stated he became very close friends with Potini, playing hundreds of games of chess with him while writing the screenplay. Robertson has been an avid chess player since a young age, which he cited as one of the things that inspired him to make The Dark Horse.

The Dark Horse premiered as the Opening Night film at the NZIFF Film Festival on 17 July 2014, and was released across New Zealand on 31 July. The film was a New Zealand box office hit, grossing $2 million and receiving unanimously rave reviews. The New Zealand Herald rated it 5 stars, calling it "a great, deeply affecting movie", with "brave, assured and layered directing" and praising the "towering performance of Cliff Curtis". A review on Radio New Zealand declared it to be "one of the greatest New Zealand films ever made".

It premiered internationally at the 2014 Toronto International Film Festival. Variety called it "exceptional...the most deserving cinematic export to emerge from New Zealand in years". The Hollywood Reporter said it was "certain to attract awards attention", and Indiewire graded it an 'A', praising it as "moving and incredibly humanistic".

The European Premiere was held at the 2015 Rotterdam International Film Festival, where it won the Audience Award for Best Film.  It also won the Best Actor Award for Cliff Curtis at the 2014 Asia Pacific Awards, and six awards at the 2014 New Zealand Film Awards, including Best Picture, Best Director and Best Screenplay. 2014 was dubbed the 'golden year' of New Zealand film.

The Dark Horse was released worldwide in 2015, and was released theatrically in the United States in 2016 where it was presented by director James Cameron.

Personal life

Robertson has stated in interviews he has been a vegetarian since the age of four due to his love for animals, and has been a member of Greenpeace for most of his life.  Animal advocacy group SAFE named him 'Hottest Vegetarian of 2014' alongside Academy Award winner Anna Paquin as a way of raising awareness for reducing animal cruelty.  Robertson is married and has two young children, a son born in 2016 and a daughter who lives with him in Auckland.

Filmography

Film
 Ishtar (Short, 2002) Writer, Director, Editor
 By Way of LA (Short, 2004) Writer, Director, Actor
 Two Cons, One Key (Short, 2005) Writer, Director
 Foul Play (Short, 2007) Writer, Director, Actor.
 I'm Not Harry Jenson (2009) Writer, Director 
 Everything We Loved (2014) Co-Producer
 The Dark Horse (2014) Writer, Director
 Whina (2022) co-writer, co-director
 Joika (TBA) Writer, Director

Television
 The Tribe (1999) TV Series .... Jay (Series 4–5, 2001/02)
 Being Eve (2001) TV Series .... Jared Preston (2001/02)
 Shortland Street (1992) TV Series .... Glen McNulty (2001)
 Mercy Peak
 Light My Fire (2003).... Luke Bertram
 Pride and Prejudice (2003).... Luke Bertram
 Power Rangers Ninja Storm (2003).... Eric McKnight
 Power Rangers Dino Thunder (2004).... Conner McKnight/Red Dino Ranger
 Power Rangers S.P.D. (2005).... Conner McKnight/Red Dino Ranger (guest role 2 episodes)
 Go Girls (2009) .... Mark
 Romper Stomper (2017) .... Director, Writer

Stage
 Joseph and the Technicolor Dreamcoat by Andrew Lloyd Webber (1997) – Role: Naphtali – Milford Playhouse
 The Mikado by Sir Arthur Sullivan (1997) – Role: The Mikado – Auckland Music Theatre
 The Tempest by William Shakespeare (1997) – Role: Antonio – Shakespeare in the Park – Outdoor Amphitheatre, Auckland, New Zealand
 Twelfth Night by William Shakespeare (1998) – Role: Fabian – Shakespeare in the Park – Outdoor Amphitheatre, Auckland, New Zealand
 A Midsummer Night's Dream by William Shakespeare (1998) – Role: Lysander – Shakespeare in the Park – Outdoor Amphitheatre, Auckland, New Zealand
 Romeo and Juliet by William Shakespeare (1999) – Role: Benvolio – Summer Shakespeare - Shoreside Theatre
 Much Ado About Nothing by William Shakespeare (2000) – Role: Claudio – Summer Shakespeare - Shoreside Theatre
 Julius Caesar by William Shakespeare (2001) – Role: Gaius Octavian – Shakespeare in the Park – Outdoor Amphitheatre, Auckland, New Zealand

Awards and nominations
 Best Director - The Dark Horse - New Zealand Film Awards 2014
 Best Screenplay - The Dark Horse - New Zealand Film Awards 2014
 Best Director - The Dark Horse - Art Film Festival 2015
 New Filmmaker of the Year Award - SPADA Awards 2014
 Best Film Jury Award - The Dark Horse - St Tropez International Film Festival 2015
 Best Screenplay - The Dark Horse - New Zealand Screen Guild Awards 2014
 Best Film - The Dark Horse - New Zealand Film Awards 2014
 Best Film - The Dark Horse - Seattle International Film Festival 2015
 Best Film - The Dark Horse - San Francisco International Film Festival 2015
 Best Film Audience Award - The Dark Horse - Rotterdam International Film Festival 2015
 Best Film MovieZone Award - The Dark Horse - Rotterdam International Film Festival 2015
 Runner Up Best Film - The Dark Horse - Palm Springs International Film Festival 2015
 Best Film - Nominated - I'm Not Harry Jenson - NZ Film and TV Awards 2009

References

External links

 
 Profile at NZ On Screen

1982 births
Living people
New Zealand male film actors
New Zealand screenwriters
Male screenwriters
New Zealand film directors
New Zealand male television actors
New Zealand expatriates in the United States
New Zealand people of English descent
Māori-language film directors